Two highways in the U.S. state of Nevada have been signed as Route 93:
U.S. Route 93 in Nevada
Nevada State Route 93 (1960s), which existed until the 1970s renumbering